Diaphorobacter aerolatus is a Gram-negative, aerobic and non-motile bacterium from the genus of Diaphorobacter which has been isolated from air from Suwon in Korea.

References 

Comamonadaceae
Bacteria described in 2014